Mabuse may refer to:

People
 Jan Gossaert (c. 1478–1532), Flemish painter from Maubeuge who also went by "Jan Mabuse"
 Motsi Mabuse (born 1981), South African-born dancer
 Oti Mabuse (born 1990), South African-born dancer
 Sipho Mabuse (born 1951), South African musician
 Bernard Sainz (born 1943), a.k.a. Dr. Mabuse, French unlicensed sports doctor

Places
 Maubeuge, northern French commune whose historical Flemish name is Mabuse

In popular culture
 Dr. Mabuse, a fictional literary character created by Norbert Jacques
 Dr. Mabuse the Gambler, a 1922 film by Fritz Lang
 The Testament of Dr. Mabuse, a 1933 film by Fritz Lang
 The Thousand Eyes of Dr. Mabuse, a 1960 film by Fritz Lang
 "Dr. Mabuse" (Propaganda song), a song by Propaganda
 "Dr. Mabuse" (Blue System song), a song by Blue System
 Mabuse (comics), a DC Comics character who is an enemy of Batman

See also
 The Mabuses, British rock band